The fluoride phosphates or phosphate fluorides are inorganic double salts that contain both fluoride and phosphate anions. In mineralogy, Hey's Chemical Index of Minerals groups these as 22.1. The Nickel-Strunz grouping is 8.BN.

Related mixed anion compounds are the chloride phosphates, the fluoride arsenates and fluoride vanadates.

Minerals

Artificial

References

Fluorides
Phosphates
Mixed anion compounds